Cayuga often refers to:

 Cayuga people, a native tribe to North America, part of the Iroquois Confederacy 
 Cayuga language, the language of the Cayuga

Cayuga may also refer to:

Places

Canada
Cayuga, Ontario

United States
Cayuga, Illinois
Cayuga, Indiana
Cayuga, Mississippi
Cayuga, New York
Cayuga, North Dakota
Cayuga, Texas
Cayuga, Oklahoma
Cayuga, Wisconsin
Cayuga County, New York 
Cayuga Lake, one of the Finger Lakes in New York
Cayuga Lake AVA, a New York wine region
Cayuga Falls, a waterfall in Ricketts Glen State Park in Pennsylvania
Cayuga Park, Saint Paul, Minnesota
Cayuga Terrace, a neighborhood in San Francisco, California

Other uses
 Cayuga duck, a breed of domestic duck
 Cayuga Generating Station, a coal-fired power plant in Indiana
 Cayuga Productions, the production company for The Twilight Zone (1959 TV series)
 Cayuga White, a variety of grape
 Cayuga (passenger train), a US passenger train operated by the New York Central Railroad and Amtrak
 USS Cayuga, three ships in the United States Navy
 HMCS Cayuga, a Tribal class destroyer with the Royal Canadian Navy
 SS Cayuga, one of the early steel cargo ships to ply the Great Lakes, sunk in Lake Michigan in 1895
 Cayuga, a synonym of the moth genus Peoria (moth)
 Cayuga, a fictional  New Mexican town in the movie The Vast of Night

Language and nationality disambiguation pages